R. Kanagaraj was an Indian politician and former Member of the Legislative Assembly of Tamil Nadu. He was elected to the Tamil Nadu legislative assembly as an All India Anna Dravida Munnetra Kazhagam candidate from Sulur constituency in the 2016. He died of cardiac arrest on March 21, 2019.

References 

1955 births
2019 deaths
All India Anna Dravida Munnetra Kazhagam politicians
People from Coimbatore district
Tamil Nadu MLAs 2016–2021